Immunopathology is a branch of medicine that deals with immune responses associated with disease.  It includes the study of the pathology of an organism, organ system, or disease with respect to the immune system, immunity, and immune responses. In biology, it refers to damage caused to an organism by its own immune response, as a result of an infection. It could be due to mismatch between pathogen and host species, and often occurs when an animal pathogen infects a human (e.g. avian flu leads to a cytokine storm which contributes to the increased mortality rate).

When a foreign antigen enters the body, there is either an antigen specific or nonspecific response to it. These responses are the immune system fighting off the foreign antigens, whether they are deadly or not. Immunopathology could refer to how the foreign antigens cause the immune system to have a response or problems that can arise from an organism's own immune response on itself. There are certain problems or faults in the immune system that can lead to more serious illness or disease. These diseases can come from one of the following problems. The first would be Hypersensitivity reactions, where there would be a stronger immune response than normal. There are four different types (type one, two, three and four), all with varying types and degrees of an immune response. The problems that arise from each type vary from small allergic reactions to more serious illnesses such as tuberculosis or arthritis. The second kind of complication in the immune system is Autoimmunity, where the immune system would attack itself rather than the antigen. Inflammation is a prime example of autoimmunity, as the immune cells used are self-reactive. A few examples of autoimmune diseases are Type 1 diabetes, Addison's disease and Celiac disease. The third and final type of complication with the immune system is Immunodeficiency, where the immune system lacks the ability to fight off a certain disease. The immune system's ability to combat it is either hindered or completely absent. The two types are Primary Immunodeficiency, where the immune system is either missing a key component or does not function properly, and Secondary Immunodeficiency, where disease is obtained from an outside source, like radiation or heat, and therefore cannot function properly. Diseases that can cause immunodeficiency include HIV, AIDS and leukemia.

In all vertebrates, there are two different kinds of immune responses: Innate and Adaptive immunity. Innate immunity is used to fight off non-changing antigens and is therefore considered nonspecific. It is usually a more immediate response than the adaptive immune system, usually responding within minutes to hours. It is composed of physical blockades such as the skin, but also contains nonspecific immune cells such as dendritic cells, macrophages, and basophils. The second form of immunity is Adaptive immunity. This form of immunity requires recognition of the foreign antigen before a response is produced. Once the antigen is recognized, a specific response is produced in order to destroy the specific antigen. Because of this idea, adaptive immunity is considered to be specific immunity. A key part of adaptive immunity that separates it from innate is the use of memory to combat the antigen in the future. When the antigen is originally introduced, the organism does not have any receptors for the antigen so it must generate them from the first time the antigen is present. The immune system then builds a memory of that antigen, which enables it to recognize the antigen quicker in the future and be able to combat it quicker and more efficiently. The more the system is exposed to the antigen, the quicker it will build up its responsiveness.

References 

Immunopathology
Pathology